Muhammad Raihan bin Abdul Rahman (born 7 February 1991) is a Singaporean footballer who plays for Tanjong Pagar United in the S.League. His injury in a match against Hougang United in 2018 rendered him unable to continue playing in the season, causing Balestier Head Coach Marko Kraljevic to find replacements, as reported in a FOX Sports Asia article. Raihan has showed a prowess in deadball situations, scoring directly from a corner in a Singapore Premier League match against Hougang United on 17 July 2022.

Club career

Young Lions
Raihan began his professional football career with Under-23 side Young Lions in the S.League in 2009.

LionsXII
It was announced in 2011 that Raihan would be joining the newly formed LionsXII to compete and participate in the 2012 Malaysia Super League. However, he left the club in the mid transfer window in 2013.

Young Lions
After he left the club, he signed for the Under-23 team, Young Lions

LionsXII
Raihan then later returned to the LionsXII at the end of the 2013 S.League season and was stayed in the club for 2 years, from 2014 to 2015. However, injuries meant that Raihan only made 9 appearances for the LionsXII in all competitions.

Hougang United
Following the disbandment of the LionsXII, Raihan signed for Hougang United for the 2016 S.League season. While clubs like Warriors FC and Geylang International were rumoured to be interested in his services, he chose Hougang because they were his first club, having trained with Sengkang Punggol as a 15 year old. Despite some fine performances, he was released by the Cheetahs at the end of the season.

Balestier Khalsa
Raihan came close to retiring before it was announced on Balestier Khalsa's Facebook and Instagram page on 5 January 2017 that he would be joining the Tigers ahead of the 2017 S.League campaign. He made his debut for the club against Warriors and scored a debut goal by a penalty. He scored his second goal for the Tigers through a stupendous free kick, handing his side a 2-1 win against Brunei DPMM FC in the Tigers' 5th league game of the season.

International career
Raihan is a versatile player that can play both in defence as well as in midfield. By the age of 20, Raihan had been involved in many international tournaments at youth levels, including a bronze medal in the 2009 Southeast Asian Games. Raihan made his international debut in 2010 against Poland in a 6-1 loss. In 2011, he received another call-up to the national team as Radojko Avramović named him in the 33-man provisional squad for the 2014 FIFA World Cup Qualifiers. He was in the starting line up for the first time against Jordan on 12 November 2011. He made his third appearance in a 4-0 loss against Syria on 15 November 2013.

Due to injuries, Raihan did not get any call ups from 2015 onwards.

Controversy
In 2017, Raihan was charge for an act of misconduct for allegedly using a racial slur by Jordan Webb during an off-the-field altercation. Webb claimed Raihan had called him a "n*****" in the 75th minute of the match. “I heard it loud and clear, 1,000 per cent. Raihan wouldn’t be able to sit here to my face and say he didn’t” said Webb in the newspaper report. Raihan was cleared of all charges by the Football Association of Singapore Disciplinary Committee (DC) and demanded an apology from Webb. K Bala Chandran, chair of the DC, noted that the evidence was inconclusive and the members of the DC had "doubts over what happened".

Others

Singapore Selection Squad
He was selected as part of the Singapore Selection squad for The Sultan of Selangor’s Cup to be held on 6 May 2017.

Career statistics

Club

. Caps and goals may not be correct.

 Young Lions and LionsXII are ineligible for qualification to AFC competitions in their respective leagues.
 Young Lions withdrew from the Singapore Cup and Singapore League Cup in 2011 due to scheduled participation in the 2011 AFF U-23 Youth Championship.

References

External links

1991 births
Living people
Singaporean footballers
Singapore international footballers
LionsXII players
Singapore Premier League players
Singaporean people of Malay descent
Association football wingers
Association football defenders
Malaysia Super League players
Young Lions FC players